In the 1997 season of the Russian Top League, the football team Spartak Moscow successfully defended the championship, winning their fifth Russian title.

Overview

Standings

Results

Top goalscorers

Medal squads

See also
1997 in Russian football

External links
RSSSF

1997
1
Russia
Russia